The King's College London Rugby Football Club (also referred to as KCLRFC and King's Rugby) represents King's College London in BUCS rugby union competitions.

Background

KCLRFC runs two competitive sides each entered into the BUCS leagues. The 1st XV compete in the second tier of the South East Region. The 2nd XV upholds a competitive nature in the fourth tier of the South East region. 

Both teams used to enter the University of London Union (ULU) cup competitions before the ULU was dissolved: the 1st XV competed for the Gutteridge Cup which was open to all University of London 1st XVs (including Imperial College who affiliated to ULU despite the college leaving the federal university in 2007); the 2nd XV competed in the Reserves Plate – open to all 2nd and lower XVs.

The London Varsity is an annual match against their closest rivals UCL played in March, and has recently been played at the Barnet Copthall stadium, the home of Premiership Rugby side Saracens F.C.. It is considered one of the highlights of the University of London's sporting calendar and takes place in front of a crowd of several thousand supporters from both colleges. The winner takes home the George-Bentham Cup, named after King George IV and Jeremy Bentham, associated with the founding of King's College and University College respectively.

The club caters for all standards of players, with players new to the game especially welcome. 

At the end of each season an annual general meeting is held where club members vote for a new committee who will be responsible for the club the following season.

Former head coach John Graves (previously Backs coach for Esher RFC) started coaching at the club from midseason 2007/08. He coached the 1st XV team to progress up two leagues, won the Gutteridge Cup and won the varsity match three times.

Club colours

The 1st XV play in red and navy shirts, navy shorts and red and blue socks. The emblem on the shirts is the university crest and features Reggie the Lion. Below the crest is the club motto which reads 'Sancte et Sapienter' (With Holiness and Wisdom).

Representative honors

Statistics

President/Captain/Treasurer

See also
King's College London
King's College London Students' Union

References

External links
King's College London Rugby Club

King's College London
University and college rugby union clubs in England
Rugby union clubs in London
Student sport in London